Joel Lawrence McCoy Jr. (August 22, 1920 – March 8, 2007) was an American football player. 

Born in Birmingham, Alabama, McCoy attended Shades Valley High School and played college football for Alabama.  He played for Alabama in 1941 and the served in the United States Army Air Force during World War II. He played four season with Army Air Force football teams, including the 1945 First Air Force football team. The Montgomery Advertiser in 1945 described him as "a tall slender swivel hipped halfback who passes, punts and runs like a deer."

McCoy joined the Detroit Lions of the National Football League (NFL) in the summer of 1946. He played at the halfback position for the Lions during the 1946 season, appearing in 10 NFL games. He completed six of eighteen passes for 72 yards.

References

1920 births
2007 deaths
Players of American football from Birmingham, Alabama
Alabama Crimson Tide football players
Detroit Lions players
United States Army Air Forces personnel of World War II